Amsterdam is an unincorporated community in Decatur County, in the U.S. state of Georgia.

History
Amsterdam had its start when the railroad was extended to that point. The community was named after Amsterdam, the capital of the Netherlands. A post office called Amsterdam was established in 1903, and remained in operation until 1959.

References

Unincorporated communities in Decatur County, Georgia
Unincorporated communities in Georgia (U.S. state)